Marco Höferth (born 25 March 1988 in Wertheim) is a German footballer who currently plays for TuS Holzkirchen. Höferth joined Bayern Munich's youth team in 2005, and a year later he was making his debut for the reserve team, replacing Michael Kokocinski in a Regionalliga Süd match against SV Elversberg. He spent three years playing for Bayern's second team, but only made ten appearances, three of which came in his last season, in the 3. Liga. Following his release, he joined SC Pfullendorf, where he played for a year, before joining SpVgg Weiden in 2010. Before the year was over, though, the club folded, and Höferth, along with the entire squad, was made a free agent, and the twelve appearances he'd made so far were annulled. After six months without a club, Höferth signed for BCF Wolfratshausen in July 2011.

Notes

1988 births
Living people
German footballers
Germany youth international footballers
FC Bayern Munich II players
SC Pfullendorf players
3. Liga players
Association football defenders
People from Wertheim am Main
Sportspeople from Stuttgart (region)
Footballers from Baden-Württemberg